The Cathedral of St. Mary of the Annunciation, also known as  St. Mary's Cathedral,  is a Catholic cathedral in Cape Girardeau, Missouri, United States.  Along with  St. Agnes Cathedral in Springfield, Missouri it is the seat of the Diocese of Springfield-Cape Girardeau.

History
Plans were made as early as 1858 to establish a parish for Cape Girardeau's German population.  The Civil War caused a delay in carrying out the plans.  Property was acquired at the corner of Sprigg and William Streets for $650.  Ground was broken for the parish church on the Feast of the Annunciation of the Lord, March 25, 1868 and the cornerstone was laid on August 2.  The first Mass was celebrated in the church on February 2, 1869.  A rectory was built in 1885.  In 1891 the church was redecorated and the bells were placed in the tower.

The Sisters of St. Francis arrived to teach in the parish school in 1875.  Two years later they built a convent on the northwest corner of Sprigg and William Streets.  They expanded the building in 1882 and opened St. Francis Hospital.  St. Mary's Cemetery was established in 1903.

Major renovations of the church occurred in 1954 and 1968.  The Magnificat windows were added in 1954.  On July 2, 1956 Pope Pius XII established the Diocese of Springfield-Cape Girardeau   St. Agnes Church in Springfield was named as the new diocese's cathedral and St. Mary as the co-cathedral.  The current rectory was built in 1957.

St. Vincent De Paul Church became a part of the Cathedral Parish in 1977.  St. Vincent's Church was named a chapel of ease at that time.  The parish hall was added in 1978 and another renovation of the cathedral's interior occurred in 1985.  The steeple was restored and a new organ was installed from 1990-1991.  The parish office building was completed in January 2000.

Catholic schools

The parish grade school was established in 1875 with the Sisters of St. Francis serving as the faculty.  A new school building opened in 1882.  The Franciscans were replaced by the School Sisters of Notre Dame in 1903.  They continued to teach in the school until 1993.  A new convent was built for the Sisters in 1905.  The main part of the present grade school building was built in 1912.  St. Mary's High School, now  Notre Dame High School, was opened in 1925.  The front part of the grade school building was built in 1937.  Yet another new convent was built in 1955.  It is currently used as a youth center.  In 1978 a gymnasium and kindergarten were added to the grade school. Improvements were made to the school offices, classrooms, library and gymnasium in 2004 and 2006.

Gallery

See also
List of Catholic cathedrals in the United States
List of cathedrals in the United States

References

External links
Official Cathedral Site
Roman Catholic Diocese of Springfield-Cape Girardeau Official Site

 

Churches in the Roman Catholic Diocese of Springfield–Cape Girardeau
German-American culture in Missouri
Religious organizations established in 1868 
Roman Catholic churches completed in 1869
Mary of the Annunciation (Cape Girardeau, Missouri)
Romanesque Revival church buildings in Missouri
Churches in Cape Girardeau, Missouri
19th-century Roman Catholic church buildings in the United States
1868 establishments in Missouri